Egg tong sui is a classic tong sui (sweet soup) within Cantonese cuisine, essentially a sweet version of egg drop soup. It is considered a more traditional and home-style dish in China, since it is rarely if ever served at any restaurants.

Preparation
The soup recipe is simple as it only requires the boiling of water, chicken eggs, and sugar. The eggs are usually cracked open with the yolk and egg whites poured right in without any pre-mixing. It is always served hot.

See also
Tong sui
 List of Chinese soups
 List of soups

Chinese soups
Chinese desserts